Jane M. Lindskold is an American writer of fantasy and science fiction short stories and novels.

Early life
Jane M. Lindskold was born on 15 September 1962, and grew up in Washington, D.C., and the Chesapeake Bay area. Jane is the first of four siblings, the others being Ann M. Lindskold Nalley, Graydon M. Lindskold, and Susan M. Lindskold Speer. Lindskold's father, John E. Lindskold, was head of the Land and Natural Resources Division, Western Division of the United States Justice Department. Her mother, Barbara DiSalle Lindskold, daughter of Ohio Governor Michael DiSalle , also was an attorney. Jane received a Ph.D. in English from Fordham, concentrating on Medieval, Renaissance, and Modern British Literature.

Literary work
Mentored by her friend, Roger Zelazny, she started publishing stories in 1992, and she published her first novel, Brother to Dragons, Companion to Owls in December, 1994.  In her Athanor series, she writes about the creatures of legend — shape-shifters, satyrs, merfolk, and unicorns — who have sworn to keep their existence hidden from a human race prone to kill what it does not understand.  In her Firekeeper Saga, she writes about a woman who discovers that politics among the wolves she was raised by and politics among human royalty are not so different.

Critical reception
Charles de Lint, reviewing Changer, praised "Lindskold's ability to tell a fast-paced, contemporary story that still carries the weight and style of old mythological story cycles." Terri Windling called Brother to Dragons, Companion to Owls "a complex, utterly original work of speculative fiction."

Lindskold lives in Albuquerque, New Mexico, with her husband, archaeologist Jim Moore.

Bibliography

The Athanor series

 Legends walking (1999) Republished in 2012 as Changer's daughter : a novel of the Athenor

The Firekeeper Saga
 Through Wolf's Eyes (2001)
 Wolf's Head, Wolf's Heart (2002)
 The Dragon of Despair (2003)
 Wolf Captured (2004)
 Wolf Hunting (2006)
 Wolf's Blood (2007)
 Wolf's Search (2019)
 Wolf's Soul (2020)

Breaking the Wall (a.k.a. Land of Smoke and Sacrifice) series
 Thirteen Orphans (2008)
 Nine Gates (2009)
 Five Odd Honors (2010)

Captain Ah-Lee series
(novellas all, published only as e-books)
 Endpoint Insurance (2011)
 Here to There (2011)
 Star Messenger (2011)
 Winner Take Trouble (2011)

Star Kingdom series (with David Weber)
David Weber was the sole author of the first book, A Beautiful Friendship
 Fire Season (2012)
 Treecat Wars (2013)
 A New Clan (2022)

Artemis Awakening series
 Artemis Awakening (2014)
 Artemis Invaded (2015)

Other novels
 Brother to Dragons, Companion to Owls (1994)
 Marks of Our Brothers (1995)
 The Pipes of Orpheus (1995)
 Smoke and Mirrors (1996)
 When the Gods are Silent (1997)
 Donnerjack (1997) with Roger Zelazny
 Lord Demon (1999) with Roger Zelazny
 The Buried Pyramid (2004)
 Child of a Rainless Year (2005)
 Asphodel (2018)

Stories
 "Good Boy" (1992)
 "Dark Lady" (1995)
 "Domino's Tale" (1995)
 "Kangaroo Straight" (1995)
 "Relief" (1995)
 "The Seventh Martial Art" (1995)
 "Teapot" (1995)
 "Noh Cat Afternoon" in Catfantastic IV (1996)
 "Child of the Night" (1996)
 "A Dreaming of Dead Poets (1996)
 "Web-Surfing Past Lives (1996)
 "Hell's Mark (1997)
 "Small Heroes (1997)
 "Auspicious Stars (1998)
 "Winner Takes Trouble (1998)
 "The Queen's Gambit" in Worlds of Honor (1999)
 "The Beanstalk Incident" (1999)
 "Out of Hot Water" (1999)
 "The Big Lie" (2000)
 "Endpoint Insurance" (2000)
 "On the Edge of Sleep" (2000)
 "Ruins of the Past" (2000)
 "Sacrifice" (2000)
 "The Road to Stony Creek" in The Blue and the Gray Undercover (2001)
 "Promised Land" in The Service of the Sword (2003)
 "Ruthless" in In Fire Forged (2011)

Non-fiction
 Roger Zelazny (biography, 1993)
 Chronomaster: The Official Strategy Guide (1996)
 Wanderings on Writing (2014)

Critical studies and reviews of Lindskold's work

References

External links 
 
 
 

20th-century American novelists
21st-century American novelists
American fantasy writers
American science fiction writers
American women short story writers
American women novelists
1962 births
Living people
Women science fiction and fantasy writers
20th-century American women writers
21st-century American women writers
20th-century American short story writers
21st-century American short story writers